Whistle Down the Wind is the 26th (and 28th overall) studio album by American folk singer and musician Joan Baez, released on March 2, 2018, her first studio album in almost a decade. The album features songs written by such composers as Tom Waits, Josh Ritter and Mary Chapin Carpenter. Joe Henry produced the album.

Whistle Down the Wind was nominated for Best Folk Album at the 61st Annual Grammy Awards.

Making the album
On November 8, 2017, Joan Baez announced that, in conjunction with her final tour of Europe in 2018, she would release a new studio album entitled Whistle Down the Wind.

It was produced by Joe Henry. It was recorded at United Recording in Hollywood, California over 10 days.  The album was made over a period of three weeks. The album features songs written by such composers as Tom Waits, Josh Ritter and Mary Chapin Carpenter. It was released on March 2, 2018, and was her first studio album in almost a decade.

The album was released on vinyl as well as digital. Her final international September 2018 tour to promote Whistle Down the Wind included a digital copy of the record with each purchased ticket in the United States.

Single
On January 8, 2018, Joan Baez made available on her website the first track from the album, "Whistle Down the Wind".

Reactions
The album features Baez singing covers of various contemporary songwriters, with NPR saying her choices "amplifies Baez ever-present gift for interpretation." PopMatters said the album was "a beguilingly modest, humble work that wears with disarming lightness Baez's legendary status, instead placing the focus squarely on the songs."

The Herald Standard says that album included a focus on "topical issues that are emotional and thought-provoking." The San Francisco Chronicle said that the "music is reassuringly spare, highlighting Baez’s rich, world-weary voice and the slowly unfolding melodies of politically minded tunes like 'Another World' and 'I Wish the Wars Were All Over' over a blanket of acoustic guitars, stately pianos and prudent rhythms." The Financial Times said it featured "pointedly chosen songs and starkly contemporary lyrics." Marin Independent Journal said it was a "a tasteful and carefully curated collection of new songs by some of her favorite writers".

It received a score of 77/100 on Metacritic.
 The Guardian called it a "graceful farewell" and gave it 4 of 5 stars. Pitchfork gave it a score of 7.4/10, Rolling Stone gave it 4/5, AllMusic gave it 4/5, and Glide Magazine gave it 9/10.

Track listings

Personnel
Joan Baez – vocals, guitar
Joe Henry – production

Charts

References

External links
Proper Records website

2018 albums
Joan Baez albums
Proper Records albums
Albums produced by Joe Henry